SpaceTime is a role-playing game published by Blacksburg Tactical Research Center in 1988.

Description
SpaceTime is a cyberpunk system, fully compatible with Timelords. Set in a nasty urban future ruled by interplanetary corporations, the rules cover character creation, skills, combat, medical technology, equipment, weapons, and alien environments.

Publication history
SpaceTime was designed by Greg Porter, and published by Blacksburg Tactical Research Center in 1988 as a 128-page book.

Renegade Dreams, a cyberpunk adventure, was released in 1989.

In 2003, the game was redone as a setting under BTRC's EABA game system.

Reception

Reviews
Challenge (Issue 39)
Games Review (Volume 1, Issue 11 - Aug 1989)

References

Blacksburg Tactical Research Center games
Cyberpunk role-playing games
Role-playing games introduced in 1988